Vok Beverages is a drink manufacturer in South Australia.

Earlier history
Before the acquisition by Bickford's of the brandname, Vok was a brand of a range of liqueurs manufactured by Jan Vok, a Dutch company, popular in Papua pre-war. Immediately after WWII sixteen flavours, from Advocaat to White Curaçao were being imported into Australia, and distributed by Stephen King Pty Ltd of Sydney. 

An early marketing exercise by the company was the "Vok Thousand", an award of £1000 (one thousand pounds — the price of a mid-range car) to a Test cricketer, on the basis of points accumulated over the 1950–51 season. Len Hutton was the inaugural winner.

The company, which advertised prominently in the Dutch language Australia newspapers made the distinctive shape of its bottles a "selling point". The company was still advertising similar products in the "distinctive bottle" in November 1978.

Drinks

Vok Liqueurs
Aqua Pura Water
Bearded Lady Bourbon
Beenleigh Rum
Black Bottle Brandy
Boronia marsala
Cawsey's Grenadine
El Toro
Frigate Rum
Galway Pipe port
HI NRG Vodka & Energy Premix
Infused Rush
Inner Circle Rum
Olympus Ouzo
Real McCoy Bourbon 
Rebellion Bay Spiced Rum
Three Oaks Cider 
TST Tolleys Brandy
Vickers Gin

See also

Bickford's Australia - sister company.
List of South Australian manufacturing businesses

References

External links
 

Drink companies of Australia
Distilleries in Australia
Companies established in 2002
2002 establishments in Australia
Companies based in South Australia